Asteridea morawana  is a herb in the Asteraceae family, which is endemic to Western Australia.  It was first described in 2000 by Philip Short.

Description
It is an erect, annual herb found growing on loam over limestone. Its yellow flowers may seen in November in the IBRA region of the Avon Wheatbelt.  There are no synonyms.

References

External links
 Asteridea morawana occurrence data from the Australasian Virtual Herbarium

morawana
Eudicots of Western Australia
Plants described in 2000
Taxa named by Philip Sydney Short
Endemic flora of Western Australia